Brand X is a jazz fusion band.

Brand X may also refer to:

 A generic trade brand
 '"Brand X" (The X-Files), an episode of a television series
 Brand X Internet, an Internet Service Provider in Southern California
 National Cable & Telecommunications Ass'n v. Brand X Internet Services, a US Supreme Court decision known as the Brand X case
 Brand X with Russell Brand, a television series
 X Brands (1927–2000), actor
 24th Special Tactics Squadron, originally referred to as "BRAND X"
 A text-based computer game also known as Philosopher's Quest
 A tabloid and blog site published by the Los Angeles Times
 The antagonist organization from the 2012 movie Foodfight!